Gully Boy is the soundtrack album for the 2019 film of the same name directed by Zoya Akhtar. The 18-song soundtrack includes work by DIVINE, Naezy, Sez on the Beat, Rishi Rich, Dub Sharma, Jasleen Royal, Ace, Ishq Bector, MC Altaf, MC TodFod, 100RBH, Maharya, Noxious D, Viveick Rajagopalan, and others. The soundtrack album had been composed by hip hop artists, rather than a traditional Bolywood composer. 

Ankur Tewari, the music supervisor who also compiled the soundtrack stated that he aimed to "bring the two worlds of hip hop and Bollywood together". Initial development for the soundtrack began on late 2015. With Tewari being the music supervisor and compiler of the entire soundtrack and score, multi-instrumentalist Karsh Kale, a band member of Tewari's The Ghalat Family also worked in the project in late November 2018. Becoming one of the most anticipated soundtracks of Bollywood, Tewari stated that the "artists of the scene would get their much-deserved due through this film and soundtrack".

It was released at a promotional launch event on 12 January 2019 and also in the music streaming platforms, the same day. The soundtrack received exceptionally positive reviews from critics and audiences for keeping away with the cliches and stereotypes, being regularly produced in Bollywood film albums which was considered as the highlight. The soundtrack became one of the best Hindi albums in 2019; apart from receiving numerous accolades, the album shared the Screen Awards and Filmfare Awards for Best Music Direction with Kabir Singh (another film released in 2019).

Release
The soundtrack launch was a heavily promoted pre-release event and its musical launch was quite unusual for a mainstream Bollywood film. The film's audio was launched on 12 January 2019, at special event and a promotional music concert held in Byculla, Mumbai. The film's lead actor Ranveer Singh performed live on stage along with actress Alia Bhatt and several other rappers and singers who have contributed to the film’s music. In addition to the soundtrack release, the album was made available in music streaming platforms and YouTube. The televised version of the launch event was aired through Amazon Prime Video (which acquired the film's streaming rights) on 26 January 2019. Irrespective of the soundtrack release, a promotional single for the film, "NY Se Mumbai", was released on 9 February 2019 and performed by DIVINE, Naezy and Ranveer Singh, along with American rapper Nas. The track was produced by XD Pro Music, a Toronto based producer duo, and Ill Wayno.

Reception 
Swetha Ramakrishnan of Firstpost reviewed it as "The best thing about the Gully Boy soundtrack is that not one song feels stretched. Each track is paced well; in fact, very often you are left wanting more." Avinash Ramachandran of Cinema Express stated that the soundtrack is a "much needed revolution in the Indian music scene". Apoorva Nijhara of Pinkvilla assigned a score of 80 (out of 100) in her music review, praising the composers and music producers for creating "a perfect combination of high tempo rap, soft songs and poems". Priyanka Bansal of The Quint reviewed "Gully Boy’s music retains the original essence of the street-rap genre. One can only hope that with all the other trends that Gully Boy is setting, honest music from independent artists makes its way into the mainstream." Suanshu Khurana of The Indian Express stated "Gully Boy’s music is the hallmark of change in Bollywood, which is getting stuck in the rut of regularity quite easily these days." Joginder Tuteja of Bollywood Hungama reviewed it as a "trippy" soundtrack, further stating, "An experimental score, this one has few songs in there which are potential chartbusters in the making" and gave a rating of 3.5 out of 5. Vipin Nair of Music Aloud gave 4 out of 5 to the soundtrack stating it as an exceptional one, comparing to the director's previous films.

Track listing

Accolades

References 

2019 soundtrack albums
Hindi film soundtracks